The Circus Girl is a musical comedy in two acts by James T. Tanner and Walter Apllant (Palings), with lyrics by Harry Greenbank and Adrian Ross, music by Ivan Caryll, and additional music by Lionel Monckton.

The musical was produced at George Edwardes's Gaiety Theatre, beginning 5 December 1896, and ran for a very successful 497 performances.  It starred Seymour Hicks as Dick Capel and his wife Ellaline Terriss as Dora Wemyss.  Edmund Payne and Arthur Williams also appeared.  The show also had a successful New York run at two theatres in 1897 for a total of 172 performances. It was produced by Charles Frohman. Mabelle Gilman Corey played Lucille and Nancy McIntosh played La Favorita in New York.

Set in Paris, the plot concerns a group of English tourists who get mixed up with a circus troupe.  Two of the famous songs from the show are "A Simple Little String" and "The Way to Treat a Lady".

Background

Ellaline Terriss wrote:
One night Sir Arthur Sullivan came to see The Circus Girl and was good enough to come round after the play to my dressing-room.  I was a little afraid that he might be contemptuous of our gay, light-hearted trifle, but no, not at all, he said he had been delighted with everything, the comedy, the charm, the setting – it is true that the play was beautifully mounted.  Edwardes had caught the atmosphere of the circus ring and the last scene, "The Artists' Ball," was one of the finest The Guv'nor had ever staged.  It got rounds of applause when the curtain went up, at every performance.  Sullivan was loud in his praises of the music, too – there was no criticism from him.  And he expressed great pleasure in my own performance, going so far as to say that he hoped I would be able to create a part in one of his next works.

Later during the London production, Terriss's father, actor William Terriss, was murdered outside the Adelphi Theatre in London, creating a sensation in the press and an outpouring of sympathy for Terriss and Hicks.

Synopsis

Dick Capel deputized occasionally at a Paris circus as "The Cannon King", impressing pretty Dora Wemyss, a school girl.  Dick, however, is engaged to be married.  Dora's father, Sir Titus, an English tourist, has been hiding in the cannon, because he has been flirting with the circus girls and is avoiding his wife.  Dick shoots Sir Titus out of the cannon.  Meanwhile, Bugs, a silly American bartender, agrees to fight a celebrated wrestler, The Terrible Turk, in order to win over Lucille, the girl who walks the slack wire.  La Favorita is a bareback rider.

Roles and original cast

Sir Titus Wemyss – Harry Monkhouse
Dick Capel – Seymour Hicks
Drivelli (proprietor of circus) – Arthur Williams
Hon. Reginald Gower – Lionel Mackinder
Auguste (a clown) – Willie Warde
Adolphe (a clown) – Bertie Wright
Albertoni (ring master) – Colin Coop
Commissaire of  Police – Robert Nainby
Vicomte Gaston – Maurice Farkoa
Toothick Pasha (the Terrible Turk) – Arthur Hope
Rudolph (the Cannon King) – E. D. Wardes
Proprietor of Cafe de la Regence – Leslie Holland
Flobert and Cocher – Robert Selby and W. F. Brooke
Sergent de Ville – Fred Ring
Valliand – W. H. Powell
Biggs (an American bar tender) – Edmund Payne
Lucille (a slack wire walker) – Katie Seymour
La Favorita – Ethel Haydon
Mme. Drivelli – Connie Ediss
Lady Diana Wemyss (Sir Titus's wife) – Marie Davis
Marie, Louise, Liane, Emilie and Juliette – Grace Palotta, Lily Johnston, Louie Coote, Alice Betelle and Maidie Hope
Comptesse d'Épernay – Ada Maitland
Marquise de Millefleurs – Kathleen Francis
Mdlle. Gompson – Alice Neilson
Dora Wemyss (Sir Titus's daughter) – Ellaline Terriss

Musical numbers
Act I
No. 1 - Chorus - "We're taking advantage"
No. 2 - Biggs and Chorus - "Supposing you should suffe."
No. 3 - Dick, Reggie, and Biggs - "Oh, I am in love"
No. 4 - Chorus and Drivelli - "What is this attraction" and "The Uses of Advertisement"
No. 5 - La Favorita - "What queen holds prouder sway"
No. 6 - Lucille and Biggs - "If the combat you win"
No. 7 - Dora - "In the dreary days of school"
No. 8 - Dora and Dick - "The charms of a circus"
No. 9 - Gaston and Chorus - "When strolling down a boulevard"
No. 10 - Dick and Chorus - "When you rise at early dawn"
No. 11 - Finale - Act I - "With feet ever moving"

Act II
No. 12 - Chorus - "In eager expectation"
No. 13 - Albertoni and Chorus - "If you really wish to hear"
No. 14 - La Favorita and Chorus - "A life to be envied by all"
No. 15 - Dick - "There was once a little maiden"
No. 16 - Chorus - "When pretty cheeks are all aglow"
No. 17 - Gaston and Chorus - "Now, comrades, have a glass with me"
No. 18 - Dora - "I was a little baby"
No. 19 - Lucille and Biggs - "Pets of the circus ring"
No. 20 - Mrs. Drivelli and Chorus - "I think that it's behaving very shabby"
No. 21 - Dance des Polichinelles
No. 22 - Finale - Act II - "As round the ring"

References

External links

Musical score
Midis, cast list and other info
The poster from the Broadway production
Photos from The Circus Girl
Review of the opening night in London, in The New York Dramatic Mirror

Circus Girl, The
West End musicals
Original musicals
British musicals